Ta Mara and the Seen is the 1985 debut album by Minneapolis, Minnesota group Ta Mara and the Seen, produced by the Time's guitarist Jesse Johnson. The album peaked at number 20 on the US R&B albums chart, while its lead single, "Everybody Dance", reached number three on the R&B singles chart.

Track listing
Everybody Dance 	5:41 (Jesse Johnson, Ta Mara)
Affection 	4:29 (Johnson, Jerry Hubbard Jr.)	
Summertime Love 	4:58 (Johnson, Ta Mara)
Lonely Heart 	3:20 (Johnson, Tim Bradley)
Thinking About You 	5:22 (Johnson, Ta Mara)	
Got To Have You 	6:09 (Johnson, Ta Mara)
Long Cold Nights 	5:09 (Jamie Chez, Mark Cardenas, Michael Baker, Rocky Harris) 
Lonely Heart (Reprise) 	1:00 (Johnson, Bradley)

Charts

Singles

References

External links
 Ta Mara and the Seen-Ta Mara and the Seen at Discogs

1985 debut albums
A&M Records albums